Santiago is a district and head city of the Puriscal canton, in the San José province of Costa Rica.

History
The old cathedral was built by Fr. Juan Cortez de Paja who took a vow of celibacy after an Indian Princess died from Influenza that she had caught from him. On the centennial of her death an earthquake destroyed the building.

Geography 
Santiago has an area of  km² and an elevation of  metres. It is located in the coastal mountain range, 42 km southwest of the national capital city of San José and 77 km north of the city of Parrita on the Pacific coast.

Demographics 

For the 2011 census, Santiago had a population of  inhabitants.

Transportation

Road transportation 
The district is covered by the following road routes:
 National Route 136
 National Route 137
 National Route 239
 National Route 314

References 

Districts of San José Province
Populated places in San José Province